Konrad Walk (born 1 July 1965) is a former Austrian alpine skier who won the Europa Cup overall title in 1988.

Career
During his career he has achieved 7 results among the top 10 in the World Cup and was 9th at the 1991 Alpine Ski World Championships.

World Cup results
Top 10

Europa Cup results
Walk has won an overall Europa Cup and one discipline cup.

FIS Alpine Ski Europa Cup
Overall: 1988
Giant slalom: 1988

References

External links
 
 
 Konrad Walk at Skisports365

1965 births
Living people
Austrian male alpine skiers
Place of birth missing (living people)